Fernão de Oliveira (1507 – c.1581), sometimes named Fernando de Oliveira or Fernando Oliveira, was a Portuguese grammarian, Dominican friar,  historian, cartographer, naval pilot and theorist on naval warfare and shipbuilding. An adventurous humanist and renaissance man, he studied and published the first grammar of the Portuguese language, the Grammatica da lingoagem portuguesa, in 1536. He was an early critic of slavery and the slave trade.

Biography
Fernão de Oliveira was born in Aveiro in 1507, the son of a judge. Starting in 1520, he studied at the Dominican Convent of Évora, where he was a disciple of André de Resende, but later left for Spain. In 1536 he was in Lisbon, when he published his Grammar, the first for the Portuguese Language.

He had a troubled adventurous life, engaging in secret religious missions in Italy, perhaps for king John III of Portugal. In 1545 he enlisted as pilot on a French ship, under command of the Baron Saint Blancard. Soon afterwards, they were arrested by an English fleet. While in London he attended the court of Henry VIII of England. Having returned to Portugal in 1547, he was arrested by the Portuguese Inquisition due to his religious opinions; he was freed in 1551, through the intervention of Cardinal Henrique.

In 1552, he became royal chaplain. He joined in an expedition organized by king John III in North Africa, where he was made prisoner for a year. In 1554, D. John III appointed him typographical reviewer of the University of Coimbra, where he also taught rhetoric. From 1555 to 1557, he was again imprisoned. After this period, his life becomes uncertain. It is known that, in 1565, he received a pension from king Sebastian of Portugal. He died c. 1581.

Works 
Fernão de Oliveira wrote, among other:
 Grammatica da lingoagem portuguesa (Grammar of the Portuguese Language), 1536, printed in Lisbon by Germão Galharde (2ª ed. em 1871; 3ª ed. em 1936; 4ª ed. em 1975; 5ª ed. em 1981; 6ª ed. em 1988; 7ª ed. em 2000);
 Livro da Fabrica das Naos (Book of naus' shipbuilding), c. 1580, manuscript in the National Portuguese Library (published by Henrique Lopes de Mendonça in 1898; 2ª ed. em 1991; 3ª ed. em 1995);
 Arte da guerra do mar (The art of sea warfare), printed in Coimbra in 1555 (2ª ed. em 1937; 3ª ed. em 1969; 4ª ed. em 1983),
 Ars nautica, (Nautical art) c. 1570, manuscript in Leiden Library,
 Historea de Portugal, (History of Portugal), after 1581 (texto apresentado por Pierre Valere, publ. in Nantes 1975).
 A Viage de Fernão de Magalhães, escripta p hu homem q foy na copanhia, c. 1570, ms. in Leiden Library,
 Livro da Antiguidade, Nobreza, Liberdade e Imunidade do Reino de Portugal (c. 1579/80, ms. in BNParis)
 Historia de Portugal de Fernando Oliveira (copiada em 1831 por António Nunes de Carvalho; in Fundo da Biblioteca da Univ. Católica Portuguesa)

References

Portuguese Renaissance writers
Portuguese Renaissance humanists
Linguists from Portugal
16th-century Portuguese historians
Grammarians from Portugal
Maritime history of Portugal
University of Coimbra
1581 deaths
1507 births
People from Aveiro, Portugal
Portuguese Roman Catholics
Linguists of Portuguese